The Studia Linguarum (literally "Language Institutes") were the first attempt to study oriental languages by the Roman Catholic Church. The need to study oriental languages was affirmed by the General Chapter of the Dominican Order in Paris in 1236. The objective of the schools was to help the Dominicans liberate Christian captives in Islamic lands.

Description
The first school of the Studia Linguarum was established in Tunis by Raymond of Peñafort in the early 13th century, where it was also designated as the Studium arabicum.It is known that in 1250, the Provincial chapter of Toledo sent 8 friars to the Tunis institute to study Arabic, including the famous Arabist Ramon Marti. The school permitted some students to learn Arabic during the second half of the 13th century.

As a side effect of the establishment of these institutes, some Arabic scientific works were also translated in European languages, such as the ophthalmological work Liber Oculorum of Ali Ibn Isa (Jesu Haly) by Friar Dominicus Marrochini of the Studium of Murcia.

In 1311, the Council of Vienne further decided to create schools for the study of oriental languages in the universities of Paris, Bologna, Oxford, Salamanca and Rome.

See also
Pontifical Council for Interreligious Dialogue
Pope Gregory IX
Orientalism in early modern France

Notes

References

 
 
 

Asian studies
Catholicism and Islam
Linguistics organizations
Orientalism